2008 in Korea may refer to:
2008 in North Korea
2008 in South Korea